Selected Poems is a collection of poems by American writer Clark Ashton Smith. It was released in 1971 by Arkham House in an edition of 2,118 copies.  The collection also includes several translations of French and Spanish poems.  Christophe des Laurieres and Clérigo Herrero, however, are not real people, and the poems are actually compositions of Smith's.

Contents

Selected Poems contains the following:

 "Clark Ashton Smith: Emperor of Shadows", by Benjamin DeCasseres
 The Star-Treader and Other Poems
 Additional Early Poems
 Ebony and Crystal
 Sandalwood
 Translations and Paraphrases
 Quintrains
 Sestets
 Experiments in Haiku
 Satires and Travesties

See also
 Clark Ashton Smith bibliography

Sources

1971 poetry books
American poetry collections